The 2010 Longines Royal International Horse Show was that year's edition of the Royal International Horse Show, the British official show jumping competition at All England Jumping Course at Hickstead. It was held as CSIO 5* and CDI 5*.

The 2010 edition of the Royal International Horse Show was held between 29 July and 1 August 2010.

FEI Nations Cup of Great Britain 
The 2010 FEI Nations Cup of the United Kingdom is part of the 2010 Royal International Horse Show. It was the seventh competition of the 2010 Meydan FEI Nations Cup.

The 2010 FEI Nations Cup of the United Kingdom was held on Friday 30 July 2010 at 1:45 pm. The competing teams were: France, the United States of America, Germany, Switzerland, the Netherlands, Ireland, Sweden, Great Britain and Spain (the team of Poland did not start in this competition).

The competition was a show jumping competition with two rounds and optionally one jump-off. The height of the fences were up to 1.60 meters. Eight of ten (here: eight of nine) teams are allowed to start in the second round.

The competition was endowed with 200,000 €.

(grey penalties points do not count for the team result)

Grand Prix Spécial (B-Final)
The 2010 Royal International Horse Show was the venue of the third competition of the World Dressage Masters (WDM) - rider ranking, season 2010/2011.

All competitors starts first in the Grand Prix de Dressage at Thursday. The eight best-placed competitors of the Grand Prix de Dressage are allowed to start in the A-Final (the Grand Prix Freestyle). It some of best-placed competitors want to start in the B-Final, the same number of competitors, who are placed after the best-placed competitors, move up in the A-Final.

The B-Final of the World Dressage Masters competitions at 2010 Royal International Horse Show was held on Sunday 1 August 2010. It was endowed with 30,000 €. The B-Final was held as Grand Prix Spécial, the competition with the highest definite level of dressage competitions.

(top 3 of 10 competitors)

Grand Prix Freestyle (A-Final) 
The Grand Prix Freestyle (or Grand Prix Kür) was the A-Final of the World Dressage Masters competitions at 2010 Royal International Horse Show (see also Grand Prix Spécial).

A Grand Prix Freestyle was a Freestyle dressage competition. The level of this competition is at least the level of a Grand Prix de Dressage, but it can be higher than the level of a Grand Prix Spécial.

The Grand Prix Freestyle at 2010 Royal International Horse Show was held on Sunday 1 August 2010 after the Grand Prix Spécial. It was endowed with 60,000 €.

(top 5 of 8 competitors)

The Longines King Georges V Gold Cup 
The King Georges V Gold Cup, the Show jumping Grand Prix of the 2010 Royal International Horse Show, was the mayor show jumping competition at this event. The sponsor of this competition is Longines. It was held on Sunday 1 August 2010 at 2:45 pm. The competition was a show jumping competition with one round and one jump-off, the height of the fences were up to 1.60 meters.

It was endowed with £200,000. 

(Top 5 of 44 Competitors)

References

External links 
 
 2010 show jumping results

Longines Royal International Horse Show, 2010
Royal International Horse Show
2010 in British sport